A Recorded Minister was originally a male or female Quaker who was acknowledged to have a gift of spoken ministry.

The practice of recording in a Monthly Meeting Minute the acknowledgment that a Friend had a gift of spoken ministry began in the 1730s in London Yearly Meeting, according to Milligan's Biographical dictionary of British Quakers in commerce and industry. The acknowledgment did not involve anything like ordination or any payment, in view of early Friends' testimony against "Hireling Priests". Acknowledgment did permit the Recorded Minister to attend at Yearly Meeting and Meeting for Sufferings.

In London Yearly Meeting the practice of recording Ministers was discontinued in 1924. 

While many Yearly Meetings have discontinued the practice of recording ministers, it is maintained by many others. Today, Friends are recorded as ministers as an acknowledgment of a variety of ministries, including teaching, chaplaincy, and evangelical and pastoral ministry.

See also
Daughters of Light: Quaker Women Preaching and Prophesying in the Colonies and Abroad, 1700-1775
:Category: Quaker ministers

References

Quaker ministers
Quaker practices